is a Japanese film director. He was given the Directors Guild of Japan New Directors Award for his debut film, Boy's Choir, in 2000, and then won the award for best director at the 31st Yokohama Film Festival for Nonchan Noriben.

Filmography
 Boy's Choir (2000)
 Itsuka dokusho suruhi (2005)
 Nonchan Noriben (2009)
 Shin Godzilla (2016, as an actor)

References

1959 births
Living people
Japanese film directors
People from Saga Prefecture